The Norman Brigade is a unit of the International Legion formed in 2022 of veterans from Canada, the United Kingdom, the United States, Denmark, Norway, Germany, Australia, New Zealand, France, South Africa, and Poland. It is not part of the official International Legion of Ukraine. According to their social media, the unit joined the Armed Forces of Ukraine in December 2022 and has gained proper recognition as a well trained unit.

References 

Regiments of the International Legion of Territorial Defense of Ukraine